Laetiporus cremeiporus is a species of polypore fungus in the family Fomitopsidaceae. It is found in cooler temperate areas of China and Japan, where it grows on logs and stumps of hardwood trees, especially oak. The fruit body of the fungus comprises large masses of overlapping reddish-orange caps with a cream-colored pore surface on the underside.

Taxonomy
The fungus was described as new to science in 2010 by Japanese mycologists Yuko Ota and Tsutomu Hattori. The type collection was made on Mount Kurikoma, in Miyagi Prefecture, Japan, where the fungus was found fruiting on a trunk of oak.
Molecular analysis of DNA sequences confirmed that the taxon is a unique species within the genus Laetiporus. The specific epithet cremeiporus refers to the cream-colored pores on the cap underside.

Description
The color of the caps fades to pale brown in age. The pore surface on the cap underside are yellowish-white to cream colored initially, sometimes becoming pinkish in age. Pores are small, numbering two to four per millimeter; they are circular at first but become more angular as the fruit body matures. The flesh has a mild taste and an unpleasant odor that the authors liken to "garbage".

Spores are egg-shaped to ellipsoid, measuring 15–20 by 5–8 µm. Basidia (spore-bearing cells) are club-shaped with two to four sterigmata, and measure 15–20 by 5–8 µm.

Habitat and distribution
Laetiporus cremeiporus is found in cool and temperate areas of China and Japan, where it grows on stumps and logs of hardwood trees, usually oak.

References

Fungi described in 2010
Fungi of China
Fungi of Japan
Fungal plant pathogens and diseases
cremeiporus